The Arab Socialist Ba'ath Party (meaning "resurrection";  Ḥizb al-Ba‘th al-‘Arabī al-Ishtirākī), also referred to as the pro-Syrian Ba'ath movement, is a neo-Ba'athist political party with branches across the Arab world. The party emerged from a split in the Ba'ath Party in February 1966 and leads the government in Syria. From 1970 until 2000, the party was led by the Syrian president Hafez al-Assad. , leadership has been shared between his son Bashar al-Assad (head of the Syrian regional organization) and Abdullah al-Ahmar (head of the pan-Arab national organization). The Syrian branch of the party is the largest organisation within the Syrian-led Ba'ath Party.

Leadership

General Secretary
Hafez al-Assad became the secretary of the Syrian Regional Command of the party in 1970 and Secretary General of the National Command in late 1970. Despite being deceased, Hafez al-Assad was the official Secretary General of the National Command. Bashar al-Assad became the Regional Secretary of the party in Syria after his father's death in 2000. Abdullah al-Ahmar serves as the Assistant Secretary General of the National Command, a post he has held since the 1970s.

 Nureddin al-Atassi (1966–1970)
 Hafez al-Assad (12 September 1971 – 10 June 2000)
 Abdullah al-Ahmar (10 June 2000 – 14 May 2017)
 Bashar al-Assad (18 May 2017 – present)

National Council
At the 14th Conference of the Arab Socialist Ba'ath Party the National Command, the party's leading organ since its inception, was abolished and replaced by the National Council. It was decided that the National Council would be composted of the regional secretaries of the regional branches of the Arab Socialist Ba'ath Party.

Bashar al-Assad was elected the General Secretary of the National Council.

National Congresses
Note: for the 1st–8th National Congresses, see the national congresses held by the unified, pre-1966 Ba'ath Party.
 9th National Congress  (25–29 September 1966)
 9th Extraordinary National Congress  (September 1967)
10th National Party Congress (October 1968)
 10th Extraordinary National Congress (October–November 1970)
 11th National Congress (August 1971)
 12th National Congress  (July 1975)
 13th National Congress  (27 July – 2 August 1980)
 14th National Congress  (15–21 May 2017)

Organization
The 1963 National Congress of the Party in Damascus advocated a far-left posture; proclaiming the party as the vehicle for socialist revolution and building a socialist society. Key Marxist programmes such as worker's control of economic production and collectivizing of agricultural lands were adopted. The party is organized along Leninist lines, a policy stemming back to Aflaq and Bitar's leadership before the split. The highest organ of the party is the Party Congress. The Congress elects a General Secretary and a National Command. Under the National Command there is a Regional Command for each state in which the party operates. The regions are divided into branches, which are divided into companies. A branch consists of two or more companies. A company comprises three to seven cells. Each cell has between three and seven members.

In theory, the National Command of the party is the embryonic government for the entire Arab nation. The body comprises 21 members, half of whom are Syrian. In practice, the Syrian Regional Command is the more powerful institution inside the party. The Syrian Regional Command is the real political leadership in Syria; the power of the National Command has become more symbolic than real. A seat in National Command has become a sinecure, an honorary post given to Syrian politicians as they retire from active political life. Hafez al-Assad rarely had time to attend National Command meetings. Instead, he appointed Vice President for Party Affairs Zuhayr Mashariqa or Abd al-Halim Khaddam to represent him at National Command meetings. In theory, the National Command could conduct proselytism and form new Regional Commands across the Arab world and support weaker Regional Commands, but Syrian policymakers have curtailed that capacity.

Branches by region

Iraq

The party was sometimes known in Iraq as left-wing Ba'ath or Qutr Al-Iraq. Prominent members of the party in Iraq include Mahmud al-Shaykh Radhi, Fawzi Mutlaq al-Rawi and Dr. Mahmud Shamsa. The party opposed the rule of Saddam Hussein and was one of the first groups to be targeted by him. The party lost hundreds of its cadres amid repression by his government. Radhi was based in Syria during the 1970s.

The party labelled the Saddam government as "fascist". When the Iran–Iraq War broke out in 1980, the party took part in the formation of the Iraqi Patriotic and Democratic Front, together with the Iraqi Communist Party, the Patriotic Union of Kurdistan and the Kurdish Socialist Party. The front vowed to overthrow Saddam. (Syria supported Iran in the Iraq-Iran War.)

In the 1980s, the party began cooperating with the Islamic Supreme Council of Iraq. The party organized the first general conference of Iraqi opposition groups in Damascus in 1989. It also participated in a conference of Iraqi opposition groups in Beirut in 1991. In 1999, Radhi was staying in the United Kingdom. The party was one of three main groups (along with the Iraqi Communist Party and the Islamic Dawa Party) which formed the Coalition of Iraqi National Forces. The Coalition was opposed to Saddam Hussein as well as United States military intervention. During the run-up to the 2003 invasion of Iraq, the party publicly denounced U.S. involvement in the organization of Iraqi dissidents in exile.

After the fall of Saddam's administration, confusion arose as to whether the de-Ba'athification law also applied to the party. In 2008, Radhi requested that the party be allowed to function inside Iraq and join the process of reconciliation. In response, the Iraqi government declared that they viewed Qotr al-Iraq as distinct from Saddam's Ba'ath because Qotr al-Iraq had participated in the opposition conferences during the Saddam years. , the Iraqi regional organization is still based in Syria.

In 2018 Radhi, based in London, visited Baghdad and met President Fuad Masum during reconciliation talks.

Jordan

The Arab Ba'ath Progressive Party was legally registered for the first time in 1993. The branch is small, and has, according to a WikiLeaks document, a "minuscule number of adherents". Despite its small size, the branch is able through its leader, Fuad Dabbour, to get a decent footprint in Jordanian media. Dabbour's fiery statements on foreign policy are frequently quoted by the press. The party is less known than its pro-Iraqi counterpart, the Arab Socialist Ba'ath Party. It is the party branch of the Syrian-dominated Ba'ath Party in Jordan. Fuad Dabbour is the branch's Regional Secretary. It is believed that the party has fewer than 200 members.

Regional Secretaries
Mahmood Ma'ayteh
Fuad Dabbour

Lebanon

The Lebanese branch was established in 1966, the year of the Ba'ath Party split. During the Lebanese Civil War, the party had an armed militia called the Assad Battalion. The party joined forces with Kamal Jumblatt's Progressive Socialist Party in organizing the National Democratic Movement, seeking to abolish the confessional state. The National Democratic Movement was superseded by the National Democratic Front, in which the party participated. The party organized resistance against Israeli forces in Lebanon. In July 1987, it took part in forming the Unification and Liberation Front.

In the 2009 parliamentary election, the party won two seats as part of the March 8 Alliance. The parliamentarians of the party are Assem Qanso and Qassem Hashem. The current leader of the party is Fayez Shukr. Wael Nader al-Halqi, the Prime Minister of Syria, praised the Lebanon Regional Branch leadership, stating that they supported the Syrian leadership and stayed loyal to the Assads despite the Syrian occupation of Lebanon and in times of conspiracies and attacks.

Mauritania

A Syrian branch was established in Mauritania in 1981.

Palestine

Palestinian Samir al-Attari was a member of the National Command in the 1970s. Until 1970, as-Saiqa remained under the control of Jadid.

As-Sa'iqa leaders
Zuheir Mohsen (1971–1979; he was also a member of the National Command)
Isam al-Qadi (1979–2006)
Farhan Abu Al-Hayja (2007–present)

Regional Secretaries
Farhan Abulhaija (?–?)

Sudan

During the 1980s, the party was called Arab Socialist Ba'ath Party – Organization of Sudan (differentiating it from the pro-Iraqi party, called Arab Socialist Ba'ath Party – Country of Sudan). The party participated in the 1986 election as part of the Progressive National Front.

The party held its third regional congress in Khartoum on February 5–6, 2009. The congress elected a 23-member Central Committee, an 11-member Regional Command and a regional secretary (Altijani Mustafa Yassin). The congress stated that the party sought cooperation with the National Congress Party for the sake of forming a national front. The party staunchly opposed independence of South Sudan.

It was reported in 2010 that Ahmad Alahmad, the Secretary General of the Arab Socialist Movement, was a member of the Sudanese regional leadership.

Regional Secretaries
Altijani Mustafa Yassin

Syria

The party slogan "Unity, Freedom, Socialism" is enshrined in the Constitution of the Syrian Arab Republic. The eighth article of the Constitution stipulated that "[t]he leading party in the society and the state is the ... Ba'ath Party. It leads the National Progressive Front seeking to unify the resources of the masses of the people and place them at the service of the goals of the Arab nation". The Constitution was adopted in 1973. As per the Constitution of the Syrian Arab Republic, it is the Regional Command of the party that nominates the candidate for president of the republic. The Constitution does not explicitly say that the president has to be the leader of the party, but the National Progressive Front (NPF) charter states that president of the Syrian Arab Republic and the secretary of the party is also the president of the NPF.

The party has dominated the Syrian parliament since 1963. The party leads the National Progressive Front and in all elections conducted under this constitution has obtained the majority of the 167 parliamentary seats reserved for the Front. In the 2003 parliamentary election, the party secured 135 of the seats. As of the mid-2000s, the party membership in Syria was estimated at 800,000. Key party organs in Syria are Al-Ba'ath and Al-Thawra. Due to the party's focus on intellectuals and affluent elites, it failed to gain support from the economically weaker sections such as the urban workers and rural farmers. As a result, its support base was vastly limited to affluent merchant classes of Damascus and the Alawite clans in the North-Western coast.

The Syrian Regional Command has 21 members. As of 1987, the Syrian Regional Command comprised the three vice presidents of the Syrian Arab Republic, the Prime Minister, the Minister of Defense, the Chief of Staff of the Armed Forces, the parliamentary speaker, the Aleppo and Hama party secretaries as well as the heads of the party bureaus for trade unions, economy and higher education.

The seventh Syrian regional party congress was held in January 1980. The congress created a new institution, the Central Committee, to act as an intermediary body between the Regional Command and local branches. The Central Committee had 75 members. The eighth regional congress decided to expand the Central Committee to 95 members. The Central Committee was charged with electing the Regional Command, which previously had been done by the regional congress delegates. The Central Committee represents the regional congress when the congress is not in session.

The party has 19 branches in Syria: one in each of the thirteen provinces: one in Damascus, one in Aleppo and one at each of the four universities. In most cases, the governor of a province, police chief, mayor and other local dignitaries make up the Branch Command, but the Branch Command Secretary and other executive positions are filled by party whole-timers.

The Syrian regional party congress is held every four years. While it is a strictly orchestrated affair, the regional congress has been a venue for actual debates on current affairs. Criticism against corruption and economic stagnation were expressed at the 1985 regional congress, albeit candidly. This congress was attended by 771 branch delegates.

The party has a parallel structure within the Syrian armed forces. The military and civilian sectors only meet at the regional level, as the military sector is represented in the Regional Command and sends delegates to regional congresses. The military sector is divided into branches, operating at the battalion level. The head of a military party branch is called a tawjihi ("guide").

The party has an Inspection and Control Committee, instituted in 1980. The Party Security Law was passed in 1979, criminalizing "deviations" inside the party and attacks on the party.

The party has three bureaus for coordinating work in mass organizations: the Popular Organizations Bureau (coordinating the People's Army militia, the Revolutionary Youth Union, Students Union and the General Union of Syrian Women); the Workers Bureau (coordinating the General Federation of Trade Unions); and the Peasants Bureau (coordinating the Peasants Federation). Children joined the Vanguards, an organization for grade-school boys and girls. Vanguards attended paramilitary summer camps operated by the armed forces. In the mid-1970s, the party ran a mass campaign for the mobilization of peasants into the Peasants Federation.

The party has its own system of political education, including the Higher Political Institute (a graduate school of the University of Damascus).

Abdul Halim Khaddam resigned as National Command and Central Committee member in mid-2005.

Tunisia
There is no formal structure linked to the Damascus-based Ba'ath Party. Most Ba'athists in Tunisia support the Iraqi faction as members of the Ba'ath Movement or the more leftist and radical the Party of the Arab and Democratic Vanguard. Only a small number of militants headed by Mohamed Salah Hermassi (a member of the Damascus-based National Command) are historically linked to Damascus.

Yemen

Ba'athism in Yemen originated in the 1950s. The party worked underground until 1990. It obtained official registration as the Arab Socialist Ba'ath Party – Yemen Region on December 31, 1995 (while the other group had to register as the National Arab Socialist Ba'ath Party). The regional secretary of the party in Yemen is Mohammed Al-Zubairy. The party ran in the 1993 parliamentary election, winning seven seats. In the 1997 and 2003 parliamentary elections, the party won two seats. In 2003, the party got 0.66% of the national vote. The party supported Ali Abdullah Saleh in the 1999 presidential election.

Abdullah al-Ahmar led a central party delegation to the 4th Regional Congress of the Yemenite Ba'ath in 2006.

In December 2008, the party and the National Arab Socialist Ba'ath Party agreed to coordinate their political activities.

In November 2010, one of the key leaders of the party in Yemen, Ali Ahmad Nasser al-Dhahab, died. He had been assistant secretary of the Regional Command and a Member of Parliament since 1993.

In March 2013, Linda Mohammed, the head of the region's Women section, left the party in protest at the Yemenite leadership's continued support for Bashar al-Assad and the Syrian Ba'ath.

Regional Secretaries
Unknown
Mahmoud Abdul-Wahab Abdul-Hamid (?–?)
Mohammed Al-Zubairy (?–present)

Assistant Regional Secretaries
Ali Ahmad Nasser al-Dhahab (1993 – November 30, 2010)
Ahmad Haidar (?–?)

References

External links
Syrian wing of the Ba'th Party

 
1966 establishments in Syria
Arab nationalism in Syria
Ba'athist parties
History of the Middle East
Nationalist parties in Algeria
Nationalist parties in Egypt
Nationalist parties in Iraq
Nationalist parties in Lebanon
Nationalist parties in Syria
Pan-Arabist political parties
Parties of one-party systems
Political parties established in 1966
Socialist parties in Algeria
Socialist parties in Bahrain
Socialist parties in Egypt
Socialist parties in Iraq
Socialist parties in Jordan
Socialist parties in Lebanon
Socialist parties in Mauritania
Socialist parties in Sudan
Socialist parties in Syria
Socialist parties in the Palestinian territories
Socialist parties in Yemen
Transnational political parties
Left-wing nationalist parties